John Bennie may refer to:

 John Bennie (footballer) (1896–?), Scottish footballer
 John Bennie (missionary) (1796–1869), Presbyterian missionary and Xhosa linguist